The Red Balloon is a 1956 French fantasy comedy-drama featurette written, produced, and directed by Albert Lamorisse. The thirty-four-minute short, which follows the adventures of a young boy who one day finds a sentient, mute, red balloon, was filmed in the Ménilmontant neighborhood of Paris.

Lamorisse used his children as actors in the film. His son, Pascal, plays himself in the main role, and his daughter, Sabine, portrays a young girl.

The film won numerous awards, including an Oscar for Lamorisse for writing the Best Original Screenplay in 1956 and the Palme d'Or for short films at the 1956 Cannes Film Festival. It also became popular with children and educators. It is the only short film to win the Oscar for Best Original Screenplay.

Plot
The film follows Pascal (Pascal Lamorisse), a young boy who, on his way to school one morning, discovers a large helium-filled red balloon. As he plays with it, he realizes it has a mind and will of its own. It begins to follow him wherever he goes, never straying far from him, and at times floating outside his apartment window, as his mother will not allow it inside.

The balloon follows Pascal through the streets of Paris, and they draw a lot of attention and envy from other children as they wander the streets. At one point the balloon enters his classroom, causing an uproar from his classmates. That alerts the principal, who locks Pascal up inside his office. Later, after being set free, Pascal and the balloon encounter a young girl (Sabine Lamorisse) with a blue balloon that also seems to have a mind and will of its own, just like his.

One Sunday, the balloon is told to stay home while Pascal and his mother go to church. However, it follows them through the open window and into the church, and they are led out by a scolding beadle.

As Pascal and the balloon wander around the neighborhood, a gang of older boys, who are envious of the balloon, steal it while he is inside a bakery, however, he manages to retrieve it. Following a chase through narrow alleys, the boys finally catch up to them. They hold Pascal back as they bring the balloon down with sling shots and stones before one of them destroys it by stomping on it.

The film ends as all the other balloons in Paris come to Pascal's aid and take him on a cluster balloon ride over the city.

Themes
As the film was filmed in Paris after World War II, its mise-en-scène is quite dark and grey and therefore gives a depressing quality to the setting and mood. In contrast, the balloon's bright color acts as a symbol of hope and light within the film. The cluster balloon ride in the closing scene could also be said to represent a religious or spiritual analogy. For example, when the balloon is destroyed, its "spirit" lives on as it is transferred to all the other balloons in the city, which is said to be a metaphor for Christ.  Themes of self-realisation and loneliness are also present in the film.
The theme of innocence is persistent and is one of the main focuses of the film. Through a child's gaze, a cynical world is transformed into an almost magical one, highlighting the power of the innocence and imagination of children.

In addition, authors such as Myles P. Breen have identified the film as having thematic/stylistic qualities that are reflective of the poetic medium. This perspective is rationalised by Breen through quoting film theorist Christian Metz, who states, “in a poem there is no story line, and nothing intrudes between the author and the reader”. The film, therefore, is categorised by Breen as being a filmic poem, partially due to its loose, non-narrative structure.
Though both poems and the film could arguably be said to have a narrative.

Production

The film serves as a color record of the Belleville area of Paris, which had fallen into decay by the 1960s, prompting the Parisian government to demolish it as a slum-clearance effort. Part of the site was built up with housing projects; the remainder was left as wasteland for 20 years. Some of what is seen in the film no longer exists: one of the bakeries, the school, the famous shaped staircase situated just beyond the equally famous café "Au Repos de la Montagne", the steep steps of the passage Julien Lacroix where Pascal finds the balloon, and the empty lot where all the battles take place. Instead stands the Parc de Belleville. The apartment where Pascal lives with his mother, located at 15, rue du Transvaal, the church, known as the Église Notre-Dame-de-la-Croix de Ménilmontant, and the bus stop Pyrénées-Ménilmontant, located at the intersection of rue des Pyrénées and rue de Ménilmontant, still stand.

Albert Lamorrise was a former auditor at the Institut des hautes études cinématographiques (IDHEC), and the crew that he used for the making of the film was entirely composed of IDHEC graduates.

The main role is played by Albert Lamorrisse's son, Pascal. French singer Renaud and his brother play the twin brothers who appear at the end of the film, wearing red coats. They got the role through their uncle, Edmond Séchan, who was the director of photography for the film.

Release
The film premiered and opened nationwide in France on 19 October 1956; it was released in the United Kingdom on 23 December 1956 (as the supporting film to the 1956 Royal Performance Film The Battle of the River Plate, which ensured it a wide distribution) and in the United States on 11 March 1957.

The film has been featured in many festivals over the years, including the Wisconsin International Children's Film Festival; the Los Angeles Outfest Gay and Lesbian Film Festival; the Wisconsin Film Festival; and others.

The film, in its American television premiere, was introduced by then-actor Ronald Reagan as an episode of the CBS anthology series General Electric Theater on 2 April 1961.

Throughout the 1960s, 1970s, 1980s and early 1990s, the film was popular in elementary classrooms throughout the United States and Canada. A four-minute clip is on the rotating list of programming on Classic Arts Showcase.

Reception
Since its first release in 1956, the film has generally received overwhelmingly favorable reviews from critics. The film critic for the New York Times, Bosley Crowther, hailed the simple tale and praised director Lamorisse, writing: "Yet with the sensitive cooperation of his own beguiling son and with the gray-blue atmosphere of an old Paris quarter as the background for the shiny balloon, he has got here a tender, humorous drama of the ingenuousness of a child and, indeed, a poignant symbolization of dreams and the cruelty of those who puncture them."

When the film was re-released in the United States in late 2006 by Janus Films, Entertainment Weekly magazine film critic Owen Gleiberman praised its direction and simple story line that reminded him of his youth, and wrote: "More than any other children's film, The Red Balloon turns me into a kid again whenever I see it...[to] see The Red Balloon is to laugh, and cry, at the impossible joy of being a child again."

Film critic Brian Gibson wrote: "So far, this seems a post-Occupation France happy to forget the blood and death of Adolf Hitler's war a decade earlier. But soon people’s occasional, playful efforts to grab the floating, carefree balloon become grasping and destructive. In a gorgeous sequence, light streaming down alleys as children's shoes clack and clatter on the cobblestones, the balloon bouncing between the walls, Pascal is hunted down for his floating pet. Its ballooning sense of hope and freedom is deflated by a fierce, squabbling mass. Then, fortunately, it floats off, with the breeze of magic-realism, into a feeling of escape and peace, The Red Balloon taking hold of Pascal, lifting him out of this rigid, petty, earthbound life."

In a review in The Washington Post, critic Philip Kennicott had a cynical view: "[The film takes] place in a world of lies. Innocent lies? Not necessarily. The Red Balloon may be the most seamless fusion of capitalism and Christianity ever put on film. A young boy invests in a red balloon the love of which places him on the outside of society. The balloon is hunted down and killed on a barren hilltop–-think Calvary–-by a mob of cruel boys. The ending, a bizarre emotional sucker punch, is straight out of the New Testament. Thus is investment rewarded-–with Christian transcendence or, at least, an old-fashioned Assumption. This might be sweet. Or it might be a very cynical reduction of the primary impulse to religious faith."

The review aggregator Rotten Tomatoes reported that 95% of critics gave the film a positive review, based on twenty reviews. The critical consensus reads: "The Red Balloon invests the simplest of narratives with spectacular visual inventiveness, making for a singularly wondrous portrait of innocence."

Accolades
 Prix Louis Delluc: Prix Louis Delluc; Albert Lamorisse, 1956.
 Cannes Film Festival: Palme d'Or du court métrage/Golden Palm; Best Short Film, Albert Lamorisse, 1956.
 British Academy of Film and Television Arts: BAFTA Award; Special Award, France, 1957.
 Academy Awards: Oscar; Best Writing, Best Original Screenplay, Albert Lamorisse, 1957.
 National Board of Review: Top Foreign Films, 1957.

Legacy
In 1960, Lamorisse released a second film, Stowaway in the Sky, which also starred Pascal and was a spiritual successor to the film.

Bob Godfrey's and Zlatko Grgic's animated film, Dream Doll (1979), has a very similar plot and ending to the film, except instead of a red balloon, the protagonist is obsessed with an inflatable nude woman.

A stage adaptation by Anthony Clark was performed at the Royal National Theatre in 1996.

Don Hertzfeld's 1997 short film Billy's Balloon, which also showed at Cannes, is a parody of the film.

The music video for "Son of Sam" by Elliott Smith, from his 2000 album Figure 8, is a direct homage to the film.

Hou Hsiao-hsien's 2007 film Flight of the Red Balloon is a direct homage to the film.

A boy with a bright red balloon is featured in the epilogue of Damien Chazelle's 2016 musical film La La Land.

Pascal and Sabine restaurant in Asbury Park, New Jersey is named in honor of the film.

Guitarist Keith Calmes' album Follow the Red Balloon is named as an homage to the spirit of Pascal and Sabine.

In the 1990 episode of The Simpsons entitled The Crepes of Wrath, Bart returns from France bearing gifts for his family. His sister Maggie is holding a red balloon.

Merchandise

Home media
The film was first released on VHS by Embassy Home Entertainment in 1984. A laserdisc of it was later released by The Criterion Collection in 1986, and was produced by Criterion, Janus Films, and Voyager Press. Included in it was Lamorisse's award-winning short White Mane (1953). A DVD version became available in 2008, and a Blu-ray version was released in the United Kingdom on January 18, 2010; it has now been confirmed as region-free.

Book
A tie-in book was first published by Doubleday Books, (now Penguin Random House), in 1957, using black and white and color stills from the film, with added prose. It was highly acclaimed and went on to win 'A New York Times Best Illustrated Children's Book of the Year.' Lamorisse was credited as its sole author.

Soundtrack
A soundtrack, featuring music adapted from the film by Lamorisse, was released on the Nonesuch Records label.

References

External links
 
 
 
 The Red Balloon at Janus Films (official web site)
 The Red Balloon information site and DVD/Blue-ray review at DVD Beaver (includes images)
  Le Ballon rouge at Cinefeed 

1950s French-language films
1950s fantasy comedy-drama films
French fantasy comedy-drama films
French drama short films
Balloons (entertainment)
1950s children's fantasy films
Films directed by Albert Lamorisse
Films shot in Paris
Films whose writer won the Best Original Screenplay Academy Award
Louis Delluc Prize winners
Short Film Palme d'Or winners
1956 comedy films
1956 drama films
1956 films
1950s French films
Comedy-drama short films